Microliotia is a genus of small sea snails, marine gastropod molluscs in the subfamily Pickworthiinae  of the family Pickworthiidae .

Species
 Microliotia alvanioides Le Renard & Bouchet, 2003
 Microliotia fenestrata Kase, 1998
 Microliotia hawaiiensis Kase, 1998
 Microliotia koizumii Kase, 1998
 Microliotia mactanensis Kase, 1998
 Microliotia mirabilis (Kuroda & Habe, 1991)
 Microliotia ohashii Kase, 1998
 Microliotia pumilis Kase, 1998
 Microliotia rehderi Kase & Raines, 2017
 Microliotia suturalis Kase, 1998
 Microliotia wargnieri Kase & Letourneux, 2013

References

 Kuroda, T. & Habe, T. (1991). Two new genera and species of gastropods from Tokunoshima in Amami Islands, south of Kyushu, Japan. Venus. 50(3): 175–178.